Herbert Nakimayak is a Canadian politician, who was elected to the Legislative Assembly of the Northwest Territories in the 2015 election. He represented the electoral district of Nunakput until the 2019 election.

References 

Living people
Inuit from the Northwest Territories
Members of the Legislative Assembly of the Northwest Territories
21st-century Canadian politicians
Year of birth missing (living people)